Tonjon is an extinct Mande language once spoken by blacksmiths among the Djimini Senoufo of Ivory Coast. It was closely related to Ligbi, another blacksmith language.

References

Mande languages
Languages of Ghana
Languages of Ivory Coast
Blacksmiths
Extinct languages of Africa